The Hahnenkamm Races ( or Rooster Comb Races) is one of the world's most prestigious FIS Alpine Ski World Cup race in Kitzbühel, Austria, held annually since 1931.

This is the world's second oldest alpine skiing competition after Lauberhorn, with the second most appreciated ski trophy after the Lauberhorn race. 

In first six years, before competition moved to the current location, it was held in five different slopes: Flecklam, Stickelberg, Pengelstein, Ehrenbachhöhe and Hahnenkamm.

Since 1937, competition is held on Streif and Ganslernhang, both famous downhill and slalom slopes, next to each other on Hahnenkamm in Kitzbühel Alps.

Since 2017 the combined competition was abolished, and now everyone who wins one of the Hahnenkamm races is a Hahnenkamm winner. There are now three races, one on friday called, the Kitzbühel Downhill. And the traditional races on Saturday called the Hahnenkamm Downhill, and on Sunday the Hahnenkamm Slalom.

List of winners

Hahnenkamm classic 
Combined winner was also Hanhenkamm trophy champion.

Other additional races 
Regular, rescheduled or replaced races that didn't count for classic Hahnenkamm.

References

External links 
 

Alpine skiing competitions
Alpine skiing in Austria
Kitzbühel
Recurring sporting events established in 1931